He's Into Her is a Philippine teen romantic comedy television series based on the 2012 novel of the same name by Maxinejiji (Maxine Lat Calibuso), starring Donny Pangilinan and Belle Mariano. The series released on iWantTFC from May 28, 2021 to August 3, 2022. The first season premiered on television via Kapamilya Channel and A2Z from May 30, 2021, to August 1, 2021 via Yes Weekend! Sunday evening block replacing Almost Paradise and was replaced by Click, Like, Share.

The series was renewed for a second season, which premiered from April 24, 2022 to August 14, 2022, replacing F4 Thailand: Boys Over Flowers and was replaced by Bola Bola.

Premise 
Maxpein is a spunky provincial girl raised by her grandmother and uncle, after her mother died in Japan when she was 11 years old. Maxpein is surprised when her wealthy father, whom she recently discovered, offers to help pay for her grandmother's hospitalization. Out of gratitude, she agrees to her father's request to live with him and his family in Manila. Maxpein is treated as an unwelcome outsider at Benison International School where she stands up against Deib, the basketball varsity captain. Deib gets their entire batchmates to prank and bully Maxpein, but the more they engage in their game of cat-and-dog one-upmanship, the more Deib realizes that his goal to crush Maxpein's spirit has turned into a love crush for the girl he never thought he would even like. However, the return of the ghosts from their past and their various family problems threaten to ruin Max and Deib's blossoming and fragile romance.

Cast and characters

Main cast 
 Donny Pangilinan as Deib Lohr Enrile
 Belle Mariano as Maxpein Zin D. Luna
 Jeremiah Lisbo as Randall "RJ" Echavez, Jr.
 Kaori Oinuma as Michiko Sil Tarranza
 Vivoree Esclito as Melissa "Ysay" Baylon
 Joao Constancia as Lee Roi Gozon
 Criza Taa as Zarnaih "Naih" Marchessa
 Dalia Varde as Kimeniah "Kim" S. Gozon
 Ashley Del Mundo as Khloe Gomez
 Gello Marquez as Lorde Dawatap
 Mikha Lim as Elle Luna
 Rajo Serrano as Karlie Granada
 Turs Daza as Dale Leon Enrile
 Limer Veloso as Gavin "Migz" Agripa

Supporting cast 
 Marissa Delgado as Bhaves del Valle
 Janus del Prado as Boyet del Valle / Christopher Santos
 Richard Quan as Maxim Luna
 Issa Litton as Macy Luna
 Ana Abad Santos as Dr. Evita Enrile
 Art Acuña as Dr. Daniel Enrile
 Joel Trinidad as Headmaster JP Quisimbing
 Floyd Tena as Atty. Randall "Randy" Echavez, Sr.

Guest cast 
 JC Alcantara as Miguel "Nurse M" Rizal 
 Shanaia Gomez as Dominique "Dom" Rossi
 Milo Elmido Jr. as Madam Barb
 Reich Alim as Rhumzell "Zell" Echavez
 River Joseph as John Benjamin "BJ" Jose
 CJ Salonga as Diego Zorilla
 Zach Castañeda as Kurt Peter Aragon
 Esnyr Ranollo as Benison Student (c/o Kumu Campaign)
 Bea Carlos as Benison Student (c/o Kumu Campaign)
 Kerwin King as Benison Student (c/o Kumu Campaign)
 BGYO as themselves

Former cast 
Season 1
 Rhys Miguel as Yakiro Tobi "Tob" Yanai
 Melizza Jimenez as Elle Luna
 Sophie Reyes as Aimee Jung (returned as guest cast in the fourteenth episode of the second season)
 Jim Morales as Choco
 Kuya Manzano as Headmaster Mendoza 
 Patrick Quiroz as Hunter

Episodes

Season 1 (2021)

Season 2 (2022)

Soundtrack

He's Into Her: Original Soundtrack

He's Into Her: Original Soundtrack is a soundtrack album by Belle Mariano and various artist. It was released In June 2021 by Star Music and Starpop.

He's Into Her Season 2: Original Soundtrack

Production

Background 
The project was first announced on November 7, 2019. Director Chad Vidanes stated that the story is a romantic comedy with a hint of coming-of-age. In 2020, the production was postponed due to the COVID-19 pandemic and the ABS-CBN shutdown and the denial of franchise renewal.

Filming 
In 2021, filming resumed and wrapped up on the same year.

On February 5, 2022, filming for the second season commenced.

Casting 
On February 22, 2022, eight new cast members has been announced for the second season, including Shanaia Gomez, Mikha Lim of BINI, Reich Alim, Rajo Serrano, River Joseph, Zach Castañeda, CJ Salonga and JC Alcantara. Lim replaced Melizza Jimenez for the role of Elle Luna from the first season, as Jimenez chose to focus on her education in Queensland, Australia according to producer Vanessa Valdez.

Marketing 
A teaser of the series was shown on the third season of Your Face Sounds Familiar simultaneously on Star Cinema and iWantTFC's Facebook and YouTube accounts On April 24, 2021. The official trailer for the series was released On May 1, 2021. The promotional poster was released On May 8, 2021. On March 19, 2022, the trailer for the second season has been released.

On May 14, 2021, global posters was released in different languages. On March 19, 2022, the poster of the second season was released. On March 26, 2022, a second poster for the second season was revealed. On April 16, 2022, global posters of the second season was revealed.

On May 15, 2021, merchandise for the series is available for pre-order on online shopping websites and platforms.

During the iWantTFC Unwrapped event On December 10, 2021, a teaser of the second season was shown featuring a tearful confrontation between the characters of Max and Deib who seem to be having some trust issues in their relationship. A new logo and snippet of the new theme song was unveiled On March 8, 2022.

Release

Broadcast 
He's Into Her premiered on Kapamilya Channel and A2Z on May 30, 2021, with advanced episodes streamed first on iWantTFC on May 28, 2021.

The second season was released on April 20, 2022, for iWantTFC users outside the Philippines and Indonesia, and on April 22, 2022, for users inside the Philippines and Indonesia. The second season premiered on April 24, 2022, on Kapamilya Channel and A2Z.

Movie cut 
A two-part film cut of the series' first season was released on November 22, 2021, via iWantTFC.

Reception 
The premiere of He's Into Her received a "record-breaking high number of views" on iWantTFC despite technical issues.

Accolades

See also 
 List of programs broadcast by ABS-CBN
 List of programs distributed by ABS-CBN
 List of programs broadcast by Kapamilya Channel
 List of programs broadcast by A2Z (Philippine TV channel)
 List of iWantTFC original programming
 List of ABS-CBN drama series

Notes

References

External links 
 He's Into Her on iWantTFC
 

ABS-CBN drama series
IWantTFC original programming
Philippine romantic comedy television series
Romantic comedy television series
Television series about teenagers
Films based on Philippine novels
2021 Philippine television series debuts
2022 Philippine television series endings
2021 web series debuts
2020s Philippine television series
2020s romantic comedy television series
Filipino-language television shows
Television shows set in the Philippines
Television productions postponed due to the COVID-19 pandemic